Ysaye Maria Barnwell (born February 28, 1946) is an American singer and composer. Barnwell was a member of the African American a cappella ensemble Sweet Honey in the Rock from 1979 to 2013.

In addition to writing many of the group's songs, Barnwell has been commissioned to create music for dance, choral, film, and stage productions. She is also known for being a female bass. Barnwell conducts music workshops around the United States, United Kingdom, Canada and Australia, including a workshop she created called "Building a Vocal Community: Singing in the African American Tradition". In 1977, she founded the Jubilee Singers, a choir at All Souls Church, Unitarian in Washington, DC.

Early life and education 
Barnwell was raised in New York City in Harlem and later in Jamaica, Queens.

Barnwell earned bachelor's and master's degrees (1967 and 1968) in speech pathology from State University of New York at Geneseo, and a PhD (1975) in speech pathology from the University of Pittsburgh. In 1981, she also earned a Master of Science in Public health, from Howard University.

Career 
Barnwell produced Sweet Honey in the Rock's 1998 25th anniversary album, ...Twenty-Five..., and edited Continuum: The First Songbook of Sweet Honey in the Rock.

Barnwell's acting credits include a principal role on a television series called A Man Called Hawk; she also appeared in the 1998 film Beloved.

Barnwell released a solo recording of stories and song, Um Humm, in 2000.

Barnwell has also written a children's book with CD, No Mirrors in My Nana's House. A second children's book and CD set was released in March 2008: We Are One.

Barnwell was named after the great Belgian violinist, Eugène Ysaÿe.

Barnwell performed her final show with Sweet Honey in the Rock, May 11, 2013, at Pepperdine University in Malibu, California.

References

External links

Ysaye Maria Barwell page at Sweet Honey in the Rock
More Information referencing the Negro Spiritual

1946 births
Living people
20th-century American singers
20th-century Unitarians
21st-century Unitarians
Actresses from New York (state)
African-American women singer-songwriters
American children's writers
American film actresses
American television actresses
American Unitarian Universalists
Howard University alumni
Singer-songwriters from New York (state)
State University of New York at Geneseo alumni
University of Pittsburgh alumni
Writers from New York (state)
Sweet Honey in the Rock members
20th-century American women singers
20th-century African-American women singers
21st-century African-American people
21st-century African-American women
American basses